The Carl R. Fellers Award has been awarded every year since 1984. It is awarded to members of the Institute of Food Technologists (IFT) who are also members of Phi Tau Sigma, the honorary society of food science and technology, who have brought honor and recognition to food science through achievements in areas other than research, development, education, and technology transfer. The award is named after Carl R. Fellers, a food science professor who chaired the food technology department at the University of Massachusetts Amherst and when the first Phi Tau Sigma chapter was founded in 1953.

Award winners receive a plaque from IFT and a USD 3000 honorarium from Phi Tau Sigma.

Winners

References

List of past winners - Official site

Food technology awards